Lars Gallenius (circa 1658 Oulu – 25 March 1753 Jakobstad) was a Finnish painter.

He was the first "free art person" in Finland. He received the bourgeois rights of the city of Oulu for painting in 1688. He primarily painted religious-themed murals and altarpieces for churches, and traveled the country looking for work. He executed wooden paintings for the Tornio church in 1684, the Hailuoto church in 1690, altarpieces for the Sotkamo church in 1719, wood paintings for the Haapajärvi church in 1747. Gallenius married Catharina Lundinus in 1690, and they had a son James. He died in Jakobstad.

References

17th-century Finnish painters
18th-century Finnish painters
18th-century male artists
Finnish male painters
People from Oulu
1658 births
1753 deaths